Maria Coventry, Countess of Coventry (née Gunning; 1733 – 30 September 1760) was a famous Irish beauty and London society hostess during the reign of King George II. She died at a young age due to lead and mercury poisoning—the toxins were used in her beauty regimen.

Biography 

Maria was born in Hemingford Grey, Huntingdonshire, England and was the eldest child of John Gunning of Castle Coote in County Roscommon, Ireland, and his wife Hon. Bridget Bourke, daughter of Theobald Bourke, 6th Viscount Mayo (1681–1741). Maria's younger siblings were Elizabeth, Catherine (married Robert Travis, died 1773), Sophia, Lizzie and John (a general in the army).

In late 1740 or early 1741, the Gunning family returned to John Gunning's ancestral home in Ireland, where they divided their time between their home in Roscommon and a rented house in Dublin. According to some sources, when Maria and her sister Elizabeth came of age, their mother urged them to take up acting in order to earn a living, owing to the family's relative poverty. The sources further state that the Gunning sisters worked for some time in the Dublin theatres, befriending actors like Peg Woffington, even though acting was not considered a respectable profession, as many actresses doubled as courtesans to wealthy benefactors. However, other sources deny this and point out that Margaret Woffington did not arrive in Dublin until May 1751, by which time Maria and her sister Elizabeth were in England.

 
In October 1748, a ball was held at Dublin Castle by the Viscountess Petersham. The two sisters did not have suitable attire to attend such an occasion until Thomas Sheridan, the manager of one of the local theatres, supplied them with two costumes from the green room—those of Lady Macbeth and Juliet. Wearing the costumes, they were presented to the Earl of Harrington, the then-Lord Lieutenant of Ireland. Harrington must have been pleased by the meeting as, by 1750, Bridget Gunning had persuaded him to grant her a pension, which she then used to transport herself, Maria and Elizabeth back to their original home in Huntingdon, England. With their attendance at local balls and parties, the beauty of the two girls was much remarked upon. They became well-known celebrities, their fame reaching all the way to London. On 2 December 1750, they were presented at the court of St James, at which time they were sufficiently famous that the presentation was noted in the London newspapers. Maria, who was notoriously tactless, was reported to have made a notable gaffe by telling the elderly George II that the spectacle she would most like to see was a royal funeral. Fortunately, the king was highly amused.

Within a year, Elizabeth had married the Duke of Hamilton. In March 1752, Maria married the 6th Earl of Coventry and became the Countess of Coventry. Her husband became involved with the then-famous courtesan Kitty Fisher, which caused Maria much distress.

She was rumoured to have been involved romantically with the 3rd Duke of Grafton, but this was never confirmed beyond doubt.

Death 
Maria's early death (at the age of 27) on 30 September 1760 was caused by lead poisoning from the makeup she used, which was very stylish at the time. Throughout the 17th and 18th centuries, it was fashionable for ladies to whiten their skin and paint on red rouged cheeks; to achieve this look, lead-based Venetian ceruse was often used. The noxious effects of lead caused skin eruptions, which then encouraged ladies to apply more ceruse to cover the blemishes, eventually causing poisoning.

Originally known simply as a beautiful but vain woman, Maria eventually became known in society circles as a "victim of cosmetics".

References

External links

1733 births
1760 deaths
English countesses
People from Hemingford Grey
18th-century English people
Deaths from sepsis
Lead poisoning incidents